John Daniel Clardy (August 30, 1828 – August 20, 1918) was a U.S. Representative from Kentucky.

Early life
John Clardy was born in Smith County, Tennessee on August 30, 1828. He was one of six sons and two daughters born to John C. and Elizabeth (Cayce) Clardy. Three of Clardy's brothers served in the Confederate States Army during the Civil War; two of them were killed in action.

The Clardy family moved to Christian County, Kentucky in 1831. He attained his early education in the county schools. He matriculated to Georgetown College in Georgetown, Kentucky graduating in 1848. After teaching school for one year, he began studying medicine under Dr. Nicholas Thomas of Tennessee. He enrolled at the University of Louisville for one year before finishing his medical degree at the University of Pennsylvania School of Medicine in 1851.

After graduation, Clardy returned to Kentucky and commenced practice in Long View, Kentucky. After three years, he relocated to Blandville, Kentucky, where he remained until the beginning of the Civil War. During the war, he spent most of his time in New York City as a member of the firm of Bacon, Clardy, and Company. He returned to Christian County in 1866, practicing medicine irregularly and engaging in agricultural pursuits. He purchased several tracts of land in Christian County and built his estate named "Oakland" into a five hundred fifty acre farm.

Clardy married Ann F. Bacon in 1854. The couple had three children – John F. Clardy, Fleming Cayce Clardy, and Fannie C. (Clardy) Prestridge. Clardy served as a deacon in the Baptist church in which he was raised.

Political career
Clardy was chosen as a delegate to the state constitutional convention in 1890. He was a candidate for the Democratic gubernatorial nomination in 1891, but lost the nomination to John Y. Brown in part because his campaigning was hampered by his duties in the constitutional convention.
He was appointed as one of the State commissioners to the Columbian Exposition at Chicago in 1893.

In 1894, Clardy defeated Judge Samuel Vance and William McClain for the Democratic nomination to represent the Second District in the U.S. House of Representatives. He defeated the Republican nominee, Elijah G. Sebree, by a majority of three thousand votes. He was re-elected once, serving in the Fifty-fourth and Fifty-fifth Congresses (March 4, 1895 – March 3, 1899). He advocated for the free coinage of silver as long as it could be kept on parity with gold. He was not a candidate for renomination in 1898.

Later life and death
After his service in Congress, Clardy retired from public life. He died at his home near Hopkinsville, Kentucky on August 20, 1918 and was interred in Clardy's County Cemetery in Bells, Kentucky.

References

Bibliography

1828 births
1918 deaths
19th-century American physicians
Baptists from Tennessee
Georgetown College (Kentucky) alumni
People from Christian County, Kentucky
People from Smith County, Tennessee
Physicians from Kentucky
Perelman School of Medicine at the University of Pennsylvania alumni
Democratic Party members of the United States House of Representatives from Kentucky
19th-century American politicians
Baptists from Kentucky
19th-century Baptists